An international university is funded by the governments of many countries and thereby is controlled by the officials from the government of different countries. These universities are often formed by the regional and international organizations.

The distinction between intergovernmental and international university is similar to the one between intergovernmental organization and international organization. International is a rather open-ended term, while intergovernmental specifically refers to the fact that the participating parties or members are sovereign states and intergovernmental organizations. As a result, only intergovernmental universities are subjects of international law.

Public international institutions

IAU designation
The designation “international university” (category regional/international in the ‘List of Universities of the World’) is applied by the International Association of Universities:
EUCLIDE (Pôle Universitaire EUCLIDE) - EUCLID (Euclid University)
European University Institute
Nalanda University
South Asian University
IMO International Maritime Law Institute (IMLI)
University of the Arts Helsinki
United Nations University
World Maritime University
Islamic University of Technology (IUT)

Other international intergovernmental universities
About 10 other public institutions established under international law have been identified as established under international law, for example the University for Peace (Costa Rica), Ecole Supérieure Multinationale des Télécommunications (Senegal), and the Eastern and Southern African Management Institute. 

The University of the West Indies and the University of the South Pacific present interesting cases. Nelson (2011) refers to them as regional universities. He notes that there is no main campus and that several national entities fund and own the institutions. Ali (2012) suggests that these two institutions are not international per se, as they are both creations of the British Crown and not subject to international law.

Private international universities
Private international universities are institutions that have the expression international university in their name, or international location, of some other reason to be categorized as international in nature. Examples of institutions using the actual name International University are:

 International University, Indonesia
 International University, Cambodia
 Ballsbridge University, Dominica: A private international university 
 Ross University: A Private international university 
 Webster University: A private international university
 Trinity International University- evangelically-aligned international university affiliated with Evangelical Free Church of America
Two well-known international university networks (private) are Alma Mater Europaea of the European Academy of Sciences and Arts, and Laureate International Universities.

See also
International Association of Universities
United Nations
Intergovernmental Organization

Articles
Regional Universities: Models for Developing Regions
Understanding The Legal Status and Degree-Granting Authority of "Regional / International" Universities

References

Types of university or college